Cryptopipo is a genus of passerine birds in the family Pipridae.

It contains the following species:
 Green manakin (Cryptopipo holochlora)
 Choco manakin (Cryptopipo litae)

References

Cryptopipo
Bird genera